Formerly called the Federation of Malaya until 1963, Malaysia started to issue stamps under the current name starting in 1963.

Malaya

1893 Malaya 2 cents.

1930s

1935
 5 December: Perak Definitive

1945
 19 October: British Military Administration

1948
 1 September: Singapore Definitive

1949
 21 February: Penang Definitive
 1 March: Malacca Definitive
 12 September: Selangor Definitive
 10 October: 75th Anniversary of Universal Postal Union

1950s

1950
 1 June: Kedah Definitive
 17 August: Perak Definitive

1951
 11 July: Kelantan Definitive

1952
1 September: Perlis Definitive
1 September: Kedah Definitive
1 September: Selangor Definitive

1953
2 June: Coronation of H. M. Queen Elizabeth II

1954
1 September: Penang Definitive
1 December: Penang Definitive

1955
4 September: Queen Elizabeth II Singapore Definitive Series
4 September: Perlis Definitive
4 September: Kedah Definitive
4 September: Penang Definitive
4 September: Perak Definitive
4 September: Negeri Sembilan Definitive
21 November: Diamond Jubilee of HH Sir Ibrahim Sultan of Johore

1957
5 May: Federation of Malaya
26 June: Perak Definitive
25 July: Perak Definitive
4 August: Pahang Definitive
21 August: Perak Definitive

Marai/Malai

1940s

1942

 16 February: Fall of Singapore  
 1–2 November: Selangor Agri-Horticultural Exhibition
 8–14 December: First Anniversary of the Greater East Asia War and First Day of Japanese Definitive Stamps Usage

1943
 11–15 February: First Anniversary of the Fall of Singapore
 29 April: Marai/Malai Definitive
 1 June: Marai/Malai Definitive
 1 September: Commemorating the 1,000,000 dollars in the Marai / Malai Postal Savings Fund
 1 October: Marai/Malai Definitive

1944
 2 February: 2nd Anniversary of the Rebirth of Marai / Malai

North Borneo

1930s

1939
 1 January: North Borneo Definitive

1940s

1945
 17 December: BMA Overprint Definitive

1947
 1 September: Cypher Overprint Definitive
 15 December: Cypher Overprint Definitive
 22 December: Cypher Overprint Definitive

1948
 1 November: Royal Silver Wedding

1949
 10 October: 75th Anniversary of Universal Postal Union

1950s

1950
 1 July: King George VI Definitive

1952
 1 May: King George VI Definitive

1953
 3 June: Coronation of H. M. Queen Elizabeth II

1954
 1 March: Queen Elizabeth II Definitive
 1 July: Queen Elizabeth II Definitive
 3 August: Queen Elizabeth II Definitive
 1 October: Queen Elizabeth II Definitive

1955
 1 April: Queen Elizabeth II Definitive
 16 May: Queen Elizabeth II Definitive
 1 October: Queen Elizabeth II Definitive

1956
 10 February: Queen Elizabeth II Definitive
 1 June: Queen Elizabeth II Definitive
 1 November: 75th Anniversary of the Royal Charter of North Borneo

1957
 1 February: Queen Elizabeth II Definitive

1960s

1961
 1 February: Queen Elizabeth II Definitive

1963
 4 June: Freedom from Hunger

Sarawak

1940s

1945
 6 November: Australian Stamps for Use in Sarawak
 17 December: BMA Overprint Definitive

1946
 18 May: Sarawak Centenary

1947
 16 April: Sir Charles Vyner Brooke (cypher overprint) Definitive

1949
 10 October: 75th Anniversary of Universal Postal Union

1950s

1950
 3 January: H. M. King George VI Definitive

1952
 1 February: H. M. King George VI Definitive

1953
 3 June: Coronation of H. M. Queen Elizabeth II

1955
 1 June: Queen Elizabeth II Definitive

1957
 1 October: Queen Elizabeth II Definitive

Straits Settlements

1930s

1937
 12 May: Coronation H. M. King George VI

1938
 1 January: Straits Settlements Definitive
 10 January: Straits Settlements Definitive

Independent Malaya

1950s

1957
31 August: Hari Merdeka (Independence Day)

1958
 5 March: 14th U.N Economic Commission for Asia and the Far East Conference, Kuala Lumpur
 31 August: 1st Anniversary of Independence
 10 December: 10th Anniversary of Human Rights Day

1959
 20 February: Installation of H.H. the Sultan of Kedah Sultan Abdul Halim
 1 July: Kedah Definitive
 12 September: Inauguration of Parliament

1960s

1960
 10 February: Coronation of the Sultan of Johore Sultan Ismail
 15 March: Penang Definitive
 7 April: World Refugee Year
 10 June: Johore Definitive
 19 September: 15th Meeting of the International Rubber Study Group
 7 October: Johore Definitive

1961
 4 January: Installation of the Yang di-Pertuan Agong Tuanku Syed Putra
 17 April: Installation of the Yang di-Pertuan Besar of Negeri Sembilan Tuanku Munawir
 28 June: Coronation of the Sultan of Selangor Sultan Salahuddin
 17 July: Coronation of the Sultan of Kelantan Sultan Yahya Petra
 30 October: 13th Colombo Plan Consultative Committee Meeting, Kuala Lumpur

1962
 1 March: Selangor Definitive
 1 March: Kelantan Definitive
 7 April: World Malaria Eradication Campaign
 21 July: National Language Month
 1 October: Free Primary Education

1963
 21 March: Freedom from Hunger
 26 June: Cameron Highlands Hydroelectric Scheme

Malaysia

1960s

1963
 16 September: Formation of Malaysia
 3 October: 4th World Orchid Conference, Singapore
 26 October: Installation of the Sultan of Perak Sultan Idris Shah II
 4 November: 9th Commonwealth Parliamentary Conference, Kuala Lumpur

1964
 1 July: Sabah Definitive
 10 October: Eleanor Roosevelt Commemoration

1965
 17 May: 100th Anniversary of International Telecommunication Union
 27 August: Opening of National Mosque, Kuala Lumpur
 30 August: Opening of International Airport, Kuala Lumpur
 9 September: National Birds Series
 15 November: State Definitive Series
 14 December: 3rd Southeast Asian Peninsular Games

1966
 8 February: National Monument, Kuala Lumpur
 11 April: Installation of the Yang di-Pertuan Agong Tuanku Ismail Nasiruddin Shah
 21 October: 150th Anniversary of Penang Free School
 1 December: First Malaysia Plan

1967
 30 March: Completion of Malaysia-Hong Kong Link of SEACOM Telephone Cable
 31 August: 10th Anniversary of Independence
 8 September: 100th Anniversary of the Sarawak Council
 2 December: 100th Anniversary of Straits Settlements Stamps

1968
 8 April: Installation of the Yang di-Pertuan Besar of Negeri Sembilan Tuanku Jaafar
 29 August: National Rubber Conference, Kuala Lumpur
 12 October: Olympic Games, Mexico

1969
 8 February: Solidarity Week
 8 December: National Rice Year

1970s

1970
 6 April: Satellite Earth Station in Kuantan, Pahang
 31 August: National Butterflies Series
 7 September: 50th Anniversary of International Labour Organization
 24 October: 25th Anniversary of United Nations
 16 December: 25th Anniversary of Installation of the Sultan of Trengganu Tuanku Ismail Nasiruddin Shah

1971
 20 February: Installation of the Yang di-Pertuan Agong, Tuanku Abdul Halim Shah
 28 March: 25th Anniversary of Installation of the Raja of Perlis Tuanku Syed Putra
 15 May: Opening of the Bank Negara Malaysia Building, Kuala Lumpur
 13 September: 17th Commonwealth Parliamentary Conference, Kuala Lumpur
 18 September: Visit Association of Southeast Asian Nations Year
 2 October: 25th Anniversary of UNICEF
 11 December: 6th Southeast Asian Peninsular Games, Kuala Lumpur

1972
 31 January: Pacific Area Tourist Association Conference
 1 February: City Status for Kuala Lumpur

1973
 2 July: Setting up of the Social Security Organization
 1 August: 25th Anniversary of the World Health Organization
 31 August: 10th Anniversary of Malaysia
 15 September: 50th Anniversary of the International Criminal Police Organization
 1 October: Setting up of the Malaysia Airline System

1974
 1 February: Establishment of Kuala Lumpur as a Federal Territory
 25 April: 7th Annual Meeting of the Board of Governors of the Asian Development Bank
 1 August: Malaysia Scout Jamboree
 1 September: 25th Anniversary of the National Electricity Board
 9 October: Centenary of the Universal Postal Union
 31 October: 4th World Conference on Tin in Kuala Lumpur

1975
 1 March: 3rd World Hockey Championship
 1 May: 25th Anniversary of Malaysian Trade Union Congress
 8 May: Installation of the Sultan of Pahang Sultan Ahmad Shah
 25 August: International Women's Year
 22 September: Koran Reading Competition
 22 October: 50th Anniversary of Rubber Research Institute of Malaysia

1976
 19 January: Mint Stamp Butterfly Coil
 6 February: 75th Anniversary of the Institute of Medical Research
 28 February: Installation of the Yang di-Pertuan Agong, Sultan Yahya Petra
 17 August: Official Opening of the State Assembly Complex and Administrative Building, Sarawak
 18 October: 25th Anniversary of Employees Provident Fund, Malaysia
 20 November: 25th Anniversary of the Malaysian Association for the Blind

1977
 14 January: In Memory of the late Tun Haji Abdul Razak (3rd Malaysian Plan)
 7 July: 25th Anniversary of the Federal Land Development Authority (FELDA)
 8 August: 10th Anniversary of Association of Southeast Asian Nations
 19 November: 9th Southeast Asian Games

1978
 15 March: 2nd Board of Governors Meeting of the Islamic Development Bank
 10 July: 4th Commonwealth Conference of Postal Administration
 26 July: 4th Malaysian Scout Jamboree
 30 September: Global Eradication of Small Pox
 28 November: 100 Years of Natural Rubber
 7 December: Opening of the New Town of Shah Alam as the State Capital of Selangor

1979
 4 January: National Animals Series
 26 January: 20th Anniversary of the Central Bank of Malaysia
 24 February: International Year of the Child
 19 September: Opening of Temengor Hydro-Electric Power Station
 20 September: World Telecommunications Exhibition, Geneva

1980s

1980
 30 March: Coronation of the Sultan of Kelantan Tuanku Ismail Petra
 10 July: Installation of the Yang di-Pertuan Agong Sultan Ahmad Shah
 31 August: Submarine Cable Project between Kuantan and Kuching
 2 September: 10th Anniversary of the National University of Malaysia
 9 November: 15th Century of Hijrah

1981
 14 February: International Year of Disabled Persons
 21 March: Installation of the Sultan of Trengganu Sultan Mahmud
 2 May: Industrial Training and Exposition Seminar
 17 June: Silver Jubilee of the Malaysian National Committee of the World Energy Conference
 31 August: 100th Anniversary of Sabah Celebration
 16 December: Trees of Malaysia

1982
 10 April: 5th Malaysian Jamboree / 7th Asia Pacific Jamboree in Kelantan
 8 August: 15th Anniversary of Association of Southeast Asian Nations
 21 August: The Freedom of Palestine
 31 August: 25th Anniversary of Independence
 30 October: Traditional Games
 26 November: Malaysian Handicraft

1983
 22 January: Launch of Malaysia LNG Export from Bintulu
 14 March: Commonwealth Day
 15 June: Fresh Water Fish
 1 July: Opening of the East–West Highway
 15 July: Silver Jubilee of the Reign of Sultan of Kedah Sultan Abdul Halim
 16 September: Golden Jubilee of the Malaysian Armed Forces
 26 October: Hornbills of Malaysia

1984
 26 January: 25th Anniversary of Bank Negara Malaysia
 1 February: 10th Anniversary of the formation of Federal Territory
 16 April: Formation of the Federal Territory of Labuan
 30 May: Traditional Malay Weapons
 23 June: 20th Anniversary of Asia-Pacific Broadcasting Union
 29 October: Official Opening of the Kuala Lumpur General Post Office
 15 November: Installation of the Yang di-Pertuan Agong Sultan Iskandar
 12 December: Hibiscus of Malaysia

1985
 30 March: 25th Anniversary of Parliament
 25 April: Protected Animal of Malaysia
 15 May: International Youth Year
 1 June: 100 years of Malayan Railway
 9 July: Proton Saga, Malaysian National Car
 5 September: Silver Jubilee of the Reign of the Sultan of Selangor Sultan Salahuddin Abdul Aziz Shah
 14 September: Opening of Penang Bridge
 4 November: Petroleum Production in Malaysia 
 9 December: Installation of the Sultan of Perak Sultan Azlan Shah

1986
 11 March: Protected Wildlife of Malaysia (2nd Series)
 14 April: Pacific Asia Travel Association Conference
 19 April: Malaysia Games
 26 June: 10th Anniversary of National Association for the Prevention of Drug, Malaysia (PEMADAM)
 31 July: MAS Inaugural Flight to Los Angeles
 15 September: Postage Due
 3 November: 25th Anniversary of the Asian Productivity Organization
 20 December: Historical Buildings

1987
 7 March: Musical Instruments of Malaysia
 6 April: International Year of Shelter for the Homeless
 8 June: International Conference on Drug Abuse and Illicit Trafficking
 13 July: Official Opening of the Sultan Mahmud Power Plant, Kenyir Lake, Hulu Terengganu, Terengganu
 1 September: 33rd Commonwealth Parliamentary Conference
 26 October: Decade of Transportation and Communication for Asia and Pacific
 14 November: Protected Wildlife (3rd Series) - Endangered Cats
 14 December: 20th Anniversary of Association of Southeast Asian Nations

1988
 11 March: Official Opening of the Sultan Salahuddin Abdul Aziz Shah Mosque
 4 April: Official Opening of the Sultan Ismail Power Plant, Paka, Dungun, Terengganu
 30 June: The Protected Passerine Birds
 31 August: 25th Anniversary of Independence of Sabah and Sarawak in Malaysia
 17 December: Marine Life (1st Series)

1989
 15 April: Declaration of Malacca as a Historic City
 29 June: Marine Life (2nd series)
 28 July: 7th Malaysian National Jamboree
 20 August: 15th Southeast Asian Games, Kuala Lumpur
 18 September: Installation of the Yang di-Pertuan Agong Sultan Azlan Shah
 18 October: Commonwealth Heads of Government Meeting 1989 (CHOGM)
 2 December: Inaugural Malaysia Airlines 747-400 Non-Stop Flight to London
 28 December: National Park Golden Jubilee Celebration

1990s

1990
 1 January: Visit Malaysia Year
 12 March: Wildflowers of Malaysia
 14 May: Kuala Lumpur, Garden City of Lights
 1 June: First Meeting of the Summit Level Group for South-South Consultation and Co-operation, Kuala Lumpur
 2 June: 250th Anniversary of Alor Setar
 8 September: International Literacy Year
 17 November: Marine Life (3rd Series) - Turtles
 28 December: National Park

1991
 25 April: 25th Anniversary of Majlis Amanah Rakyat
 29 July: Insects (First Series)
 30 August: Past Prime Minister of Malaysia
 21 December: 100 Years Sarawak Museum

1992
 1 January: Launch of Pos Malaysia Berhad
 23 March: Malaysia Tropical Forest
 18 April: Silver Jubilee of the Reign of The Yang di-Pertuan Besar of Negeri Sembilan Tuanku Ja'afar
 25 July: Thomas Cup Champion - Badminton Championship Challenge Trophy
 8 August: 25th Anniversary of Association of Southeast Asian Nations
 1 September: 125th Anniversary of the First Stamp in Malaysia
 21 December: Malaysian Corals

1993
 24 April: 16th Asia-Pacific Dental Congress
 24 June: Centenary of Royal Selangor Golf Club
 2 August: Malaysian Wildflowers (2nd Series)
 13 September: 14th Commonwealth Forestry Conference
 23 October: Birds (Kingfishers of Malaysia)
 7 December: Langkawi International Maritime and Aerospace Exhibition

1994
 1 January: Visit Malaysia Year
 7 February: National Planetarium
 17 February: Orchids of Malaysia
 17 June: World Islamic Civilization Festival
 26 July: A centenary of Veterinary Services and Animal Industry in Malaysia
 3 September: 100 Years Before and After - An Electrifying Pace
 8 September: The North-South Expressway
 22 September: Installation of His Majesty the 10th Yang di-Pertuan Agong Tuanku Ja'afar
 29 October: Pre-Issue - XVI Commonwealth Games
 10 November: The Tunku Abdul Rahman Memorial
 16 December: Official Opening of the National Library Building

1995
 18 January: Fungi of Malaysia
 18 April: Clouded leopard of Malaysia / World Wide Fund for Nature
 29 May: 100 Year of X-ray
 1 September: Traditional Malay Weapons Series II
 11 September: Pre-Issue 95 - XVI Commonwealth Games (2nd Issue)
 24 October: 50th Anniversary of the United Nations
 30 October: 50 Year of IATA (International Air Transport Association)
 4 December: Golden Jubilee of the Reign of the Raja of Perlis Tuanku Syed Putra
 23 December: 10th Anniversary of PROTON

1996
 13 January: Launch of MEASAT 1 (Malaysia East-Asia Satellite) 
 6 April: Pitcher Plants of Malaysia
 18 May: Birds of Prey
 26 June: International Day against Drug Abuse and Illicit Trafficking
 27 September: Butterflies of Malaysia
 1 October: Kuala Lumpur Tower
 7 October: The 14th Conference of the Confederation of Asian and Pacific Accountants
 29 November: National Science Centre
 2 December: Stamp Week 1996 Wildlife
 21 December: Pre-Issue 96 - XVI Commonwealth Games (3rd issue)

1997
 4 January: Highland Birds of Malaysia
 1 March: Light Rail Transit System
 24 March: 1997 ICC Trophy
 2 April: 50 Years of Aviation in Malaysia
 16 June: 9th World Youth Football Championship
 31 July: Centenary of the Conference of Rulers
 8 August: 30th Anniversary of Association of Southeast Asian Nations
 23 August: International Year of the Reef
 25 August: 20th PPSEAWA International Conference
 9 September: 50 Years of Organised Philately
 3 November: The 7th Summit Level of the Group of 15
 15 November: Pre-Issue 97 - XVI Commonwealth Games (4th Issue)
 1 December: Stamp Week 1997 / Protected Wildlife

1998
 10 January: Rare Fruits of Malaysia
 23 February: Venues of the Kuala Lumpur 98 - XVI Commonwealth Games 
 11 April: Currency Heritage
 8 Mei: Malaysian Red Crescent Society
 27 June: Kuala Lumpur International Airport
 18 July: Medicinal Plant of Malaysia
 11 September: Kuala Lumpur 98 - XVI Commonwealth Games
 31 October: Modernisation of Rail Transport
 14 November: APEC (Asia-Pacific Economic Cooperation) Conference
 28 November: Stamp Week 1998 / Insects of Malaysia
 12 December: Glorious Moments from the Kuala Lumpur 98 Games

1999
 28 January: International Year of Older Persons
 27 February: Rare Fruits of Malaysia (Series II)
 4 March: Installation of the Sultan of Terengganu Sultan Mizan Zainal Abidin  
 1 April: Cats in Malaysia
 28 May: Protected Mammals in Malaysia
 19 June: 5th International Congress on AIDS in Asia and the Pacific
 19 June: Freshwater Fishes of Malaysia
 24 July: P. Ramlee, Artist Supreme
 30 August: Petronas Twin Towers
 1 September: Taiping, Perak (1874-1999)
 9 September: 50th Anniversary of TNB - Powering the Nation's Progress
 15 September: National Theatre
 23 September: Installation of His Majesty the XI Yang di-Pertuan Agong Sultan Salahuddin Abdul Aziz Shah
 3 October: 21st World Road Congress
 17 October: Malaysia Grand Prix 1999 Sepang
 23 October: The Silver Jubilee of His Royal Highness's Installation as The Sultan of Pahang (1974-1999) Sultan Haji Ahmad Shah
 18 November: World Golf Cup Malaysia '99
 29 November: Stamp Week 1999 / Heliconia and its Botanical relatives
 18 December: 125 Years of Universal Postal Union
 31 December: Celebrate the New Millennium (Series l)

2000s

2000
 1 January: Celebrate the Millennium (Series II)
 6 January: Celebrate the year of the Dragon
 19 February: World Team Table Tennis Championships
 20 February: Celebrate the Millennium (Series III)
 20 February: Spirit of the New Malaysian
 7 March: The 2nd Global Knowledge Conference
 6 April: Islamic Arts Museum Malaysia
 15 April: Traditional Boats of Malaysia 
 20 April: Unit Trust Week
 11 May: Thomas /Uber Cup, K.L. 2000
 24 June: Children's Traditional Games (Series I)
 26 June: 27th Session of the Islamic Conference of the Foreign Ministers (ICFM)
 5 July: Census for Planning in the New Millennium
 22 July: Birds of Malaysia 
 23 July: National Animal Welfare Week 2000
 7 August: XXI IUFRO World Congress
 24 August: 100 Year of Institute for Medical research
 26 August: Protected Mammals (2nd Series)
 14 September: 50th Anniversary of Majlis Amanah Rakyat
 16 September: Children's Traditional Games (Series II)
 24 September: World Heart Day
 9 October: Stamp Week 2000 / Highland Flowers of Malaysia (2nd Series)
 25 November: Dragonflies and Damselflies

2001
 22 January: Quails & Partridges
 1 February: Formation of Putrajaya Federal Territory
 17 February: Sabah & Sarawak Beads
 27 March: Scented Flowers of Malaysia
 7 May: Installation of His Royal Highness Raja of Perlis Tuanku Syed Sirajuddin
 11 June: Cultural Instrument & Artefact
 9 July: Malaysian Made Vehicles (Series II)
 1 August: Malaysian Bantams
 8 September: XXI SEA Games
 27 September: FDI World Dental Congress
 1 October: 50th Anniversary of Employees Provident Fund
 18 October: 100th Anniversary of Forestry Department
 10 November: Stamp Week 2001 / Marine Life (Series V)

2002
 2 January: 2002 Men's Hockey World Cup
 5 February: Rare Flowers Joint Issue Stamp Malaysia-China
 9 March: Species of Snakes in Malaysia
 13 April: Express Rail Link
 24 April: 17th World Orchid Conference
 25 April: Installation of His Majesty the 12th Yang di-Pertuan Agong Tuanku Syed Sirajuddin
 25 April: Special Edition - Their Majesties Yang di-Pertuan Agong of Malaysia (Series I)
 17 May: Aquatic plants of Malaysia
 27 June: Tropical Birds Malaysia-Singapore Joint Issue
 31 July: Islands and Beaches of Malaysia
 24 August: Malaysian Unity
 17 September: Famous Scholar - Zainal Abidin bin Ahmad
 2 November: Malaysia's Fashion Heritage
 29 November: Celebration 80 Years of SITC-MPSI-IPSI-UPSI
 17 December: Stamp Week 2002 - The Tame and The Wild

2003
 25 January: Protected Wildlife - Southern Serow
 6 February: XIII Conference of Heads of State or Government of the Non-Aligned Movement
 22 February: Roses in Malaysia
 3 March: Father of Independence (100 Years Birth of the Late Tunku Abdul Rahman Putra Al-Haj)
 8 March: Coronation of H.R.H. Sultan Selangor IX Sultan Sharafuddin Idris Shah
 26 April: Ornamental Fish - Fighting Fish
 24 May: Historical Places - Clock Towers
 28 June: Islands and Beaches of Malaysia (Series II) - Pulau Ligitan & Pulau Sipadan
 19 August: Merdeka Series - 46th Independence Celebration
 27 September: Malaysian Made Vehicles Series IV - Motorcycles & Scooters
 3 October: 10th Session of the Islamic Summit Conference
 11 October: 50th World Children's Day Celebration
 16 December: Stamp Week 2003 - Primates of Malaysia - Red Leaf & Proboscis Monkey

2004
 31 January: Historical Buildings - Lighthouse
 9 February: 7th Conference of Parties to the Convention on Biological Diversity & 1st Meeting of Parties to the Cartagena Protocol on Biosafety
 29 February: Silver Jubilee of the Reign of H.R.H. the Sultan of Kelantan Sultan Ismail Petra
 19 March: Commonwealth Tourism Ministers' Meeting 2004
 22 May: National Service Programme - The Making of Our Future Leaders
 31 May: 30th Anniversary Malaysia-China Diplomatic Relationship
 14 June: Wildlife in the Malaysian Forest
 1 July: Malaysia's Multimedia Super Corridor (MSC)
 24 July: Major Ports of Malaysia
 18 August: Traditional Transportation
 4 October: 100th Years of Matang Mangroves Park, Perak
 9 October: Stamp Week 2004 - Marine Life (Series VI)
 11 December: Medicinal Plants - Series II

2005
 11 January: Rare Flowers Series II
 24 January: The 5th Ministers' Forum on Infrastructure Development in the Asia-Pacific Region
 3 February: Migratory Birds of Malaysia
 7 March: Proton Gen.2, Proton's New Generation
 9 April: Traditional Dance
 29 April: Songket, The Regal Heritage
 14 May: Birds of Malaysia (Definitive Series)
 9 June: 100 Years of University of Malaya
 21 July: 600th Anniversary Malaysia - China Relationship
 27 July: Protected Mammals Series III
 9 August: Traditional Water Transport
 30 August: 100th Anniversary of the Malay College Kuala Kangsar
 28 September: Rare Reptiles of Malaysia
 10 October: Traditional Kites - Wau
 2 December: Stamp Week 2005 - Malaysian batik, Crafted For The World
 12 December: 11th ASEAN Summit
 22 December: Malaysia's Five Islands & Reefs in the South China Seas

2006
 26 January: Wild duck species
 14 February: National Audit Academy 100th Anniversary
 28 March: Rare Fruits Series III
 26 April: Mountains of Malaysia
 25 May: Freshwater fish Series III
 22 June: 50th Anniversary of the Dewan Bahasa dan Pustaka
 7 July: Felda 50 Years Celebration
 18 July: Sultan Azlan Shah Gallery
 15 August: Malaysian festivals
 29 August: Traditional costumes
 9 October: Semi Aquatic Animals (Stamp Week 2006)
 6 November: XVIII FIGO World Congress of Gynaecology and Obstetrics
 25 November: 9th FESPIC Games Kuala Lumpur 2006
 30 November: 15th Anniversary of ASEAN-China Dialogue Relation
 4 December: 25th General Assembly of the World Veterans Federation
 28 December: South Pole Expedition

2007
 6 February: Unique Marine Life / Malaysia-Brunei Joint Issue
 19 March: Visit Malaysia Year 2007
 26 April: Installation of His Majesty the 13th Yang di-Pertuan Agong Tuanku Mizan Zainal Abidin
 3 May: Frogs of Malaysia
 24 May: Air transportation in Malaysia
 6 June: Clock towers Series II
 26 June: Traditional Children's Folk-Tales
 7 July: Insects Series III
 24 July: 200 Years Police Force
 2 August: Royal Heritage of Negeri Sembilan
 8 August: 40th Anniversary of ASEAN / Asean Joint Issue
 31 August: Golden Jubilee Celebration of the Independence of Malaysia
 4 September: Aga Khan Award for Architecture
 25 September: State Emblems
 26 November: Rare Vegetables (Stamp Week 2007)
 13 December: FEI 5 Stars KL Grand Prix 2007
 31 December: Garden Flowers - State Definitive Series

2008
 28 February: Bridges of Malaysia
 13 March: Nocturnal animals
 24 April: Butterflies Of Malaysia
 22 May: 100th Anniversary of St. John Ambulance of Malaysia
 10 June: Cultural Instruments & Artefacts II
 15 July: Golden Jubilee of the Reign of His Royal Highness Sultan Abdul Halim Mu'adzam Shah Sultan Negeri Kedah Darul Aman
 1 August: 6th IDBF Club Crew World Championships 2008
 14 August: Centenary Celebration of the Scouts Association of Malaysia
 28 August: Treasures of the Nation's Visual Arts
 16 September: Royal Headgear
 9 October: Unique Flowers
 21 October: National Angkasawan Programme
 11 November: Seashells of Malaysia
 1 December: Malaysian Cartoons - Lat (Stamp Week 2008)
 16 December: Premier Schools

2009
 21 January: Unique Birds of Malaysia
 3 February: Silver Jubilee of the Reign of His Royal Highness Paduka Seri Sultan Azlan Muhibbuddin Shah Sultan Perak Darul Ridzuan
 23 March: Traditional Wedding Costumes
 9 April: World Heritage Sites
 20 April: Engineering Excellence in Nation Building
 19 May: Palm trees
 31 May: 35th Anniversary of the Establishment of Diplomatic Relations between Malaysia and the People's Republic of China
 1 June: Conservation of Nature
 9 July: Traditional Houses
 23 July: Tuber Plants
 31 August: 1Malaysia
 3 September: The First Malaysian Submarine
 9 September: Energy Efficient Buildings
 9 October: Caring Society
 26 October: Installation of His Royal Highness Tuanku Muhriz Negeri Sembilan
 24 November: State Definitive Series Special Collection - Garden Flowers
 7 December: Arachnid - Stamp Week 2009

2010s

2010
 18 January: Malaysian Currency
 23 February: The 50th Anniversary of Malaysia-Korea Diplomatic Relations / Malaysia-Korea Joint Issue
 10 March: Ferns
 23 March: Local Markets
 26 April: Medical Excellence
 10 May: Firefly
 22 June: 125 Years Malayan Railways
 1 July: Garden Flowers - New Tariff (National Definitive Series)
 15 July: Threatened Habitats
 31 July: Grand Knight Of Valour
 10 August: Traditional Festive Food
 27 September: Lifestyles of the Aboriginal people
 9 October: Old Post offices
 24 October: Heritage Of Pahang Darul Makmur
 10 November: 1Malaysia Collection
 13 December: Traditional Past Time Games With Upin & Ipin and Friends - Stamp Week 2010

2011
 18 January: Children's Pet
 21 February: Highland Tourist Spot
 28 February: AFF Suzuki Cup 2010 Champion
 28 March: Spices
 11 April: Artifacts Of National Heritage
 28 April: SetemKu - Silver Handicraft
 13 June: Virtues
 7 July: 100 Years of Aviation
 18 July: Royal Palaces
 8 August: Malaysia-Indonesia Joint Issue
 19 September: Visual art - Series II
 10 October: Post Box - Stamp Week 2011
 21 November: Underground Engineering Excellence
 12 December: Royal Institution

2012

 12 January: Legacy of the Loom
 27 February: Yes To Life, No To Drugs
 8 March: Malaysian Antarctic Research Programme
 21 March: Underwater life
 11 April: Installation of His Majesty the Yang di-Pertuan Agong XIV
 24 May: Aromatic Plants
 4 June: World Gas Conference 2012
 21 June: Traditional Livelihood
 21 June: Special Edition Series II - Their Majesties Yang di-Pertuan Agong of Malaysia
 16 July: Second Series of Malaysian Currency
 30 August: Malaysian Unity Series II (Malaysia Day)
 13 September: The Diamond Jubilee of Queen Elizabeth II
 27 September: Malaysian Festivals Series II
 7 October: 750 Years Malacca
 22 October: Postman's Uniform
 5 November: SetemKu Issue - Salam Malaysia / Malaysia di Hatiku
 19 November: Children's Hobbies (BoBoiBoy) - Stamp Week 2012
 20 December: Postal History of Kedah

2013
 13 January: Woodpecker
 5 February: Exotic pets
 26 March: National Unity
 30 April: Lighthouses in Malaysia Series 2
 13 May  Wonders of Malaysian Forests
 28 June: Living Corals in Malaysia
 25 July: Malaysian Salad
 23 August: Trination (Trination Exhibition 23-25 Aug)
 31 August: Museums and Artifacts
 16 September: 50 Years Malaysia Day - Stamp Week 2013
 9 October: Postcard World Postal Day 2013
 22 October: Celebrating Abilities of Children with Disabilities : Colours of My World
 28 October: Rare Fruits Series IV
 23 November: 100 Years RHB Bank
 29 November: Baba Nyonya Heritage
 23 December: Endangered Big Cats of Malaysia

2014
 27 January: Horse
 14 February: Rose Series 2
 13 March: Museum & Artifacts - Unveiling of the Hidden Treasures
 26 April: President Barack Obama's Visit to Malaysia
 24 May: Melaka & Jogja – City of Museums
 31 May: 40 Years Diplomatic Relation between Malaysia-China
 18 June: Grand Opening World Scout Bureau Kuala Lumpur Office
 24 June: KLIA2
 17 July: Malaysian Fruits
 31 August: 57th Independence Celebration
 19 October: Local Food / Kuala Lumpur, Malaysia-Hong Kong, China Joint Issue
 27 October: Malay Folk Stories
 5 November: World Youth Stamp Exhibition 2014 - KLCC
 1 December: World Youth Stamp Exhibition 2014
 23 December: The Celebration Of 40 Years Of Reign Of KDYMM Sultan Pahang
 31 December: The Sultan Abdul Halim Mu'Adzam Shah Bridge, Penang

2015
 20 January: Medicinal Plants Series III
 27 January: Malaysia Chairman Asean 2015
 16 February: Farm Animals
 25 February: International Cooperative Project On Giant Panda
17 March: The 13th Langkawi International Maritime and Aerospace Exhibition 
 23 March: Coronation of KDYMM Sultan Johor
 13 April: Endangered Marine Life
 30 April: 175th Year Anniversary of Penny Black
 6 May: Installation of Paduka Seri Sultan Perak XXXV Sultan Nazrin Muizzuddin Shah
 17 May: 150th Anniversary of International Telecommunication Union
 8 June: Malaysia-Thailand Joint Issue (Marine Creatures)
 25 June: Herons & Bitterns
 29 July: Pearls
 8 August: Joint Stamp Issue of ASEAN Community
 27 August: Mosques in Malaysia
 8 September: Panda Postal Card
 15 September: MALAYSIA #sehatisejiwa
 9 October: World Post Day
 27 October: Stamp Week 2015
 17 November: Islands and Beaches Series III
 4 December: FourNation Stamp Exhibition
 28 December: Malaysian Public Transport (Trains in Sabah)

2016
 26 January: Primates of Malaysia Series 2
 3 February: Traditional Dances Series 2
 25 February: Definitive Series - JOHOR
 7 March: Scented Flowers Series 2
 21 March: Definitive Series - PERAK
 29 April: National Laureates
 26 May: River Transportation in Sarawak
 28 June: Malaysian Calligraphy
 27 July: Tourist Destinations - Kedah & Kelantan
 23 August: Seven Wonders of Malaysia's Flora & Fauna
 15 September: Battle Sites
 1 October: International Definitive Stamps - Stamp Week 2016
 9 October: Posmen Komuniti
 21 October: Penang Free School - 200 Years of Excellence
 21 November: Places of Worship
 9 December: 100 Tahun Persatuan Pandu Puteri Malaysia
 12 December: Pemerintahan Seri Paduka Baginda Yang Di-Pertuan Agong XIV ALMU'TASIMU BILLAHI MUHIBBUDDIN TUANKU ALHAJ ABDUL HALIM MU'ADZAM SHAH IBNI ALMARHUM SULTAN BADLISHAH
 20 December: Paralympics Golden Moments in RIO 2016

2017
 10 January: Malaysian Serama
 24 January: Festival Food Series - Chinese
 9 February: Chung Ling High School Centenary
 21 February: National Definitives Series - Orchids
 16 March: Festival Food Series - Kadazandusun & Dayak
 28 March: Festive Greeting
 24 April: Installation of the XV Yang di-Pertuan Agong  Sultan Muhammad V
 18 May: 100th Anniversary of Oil Palm Industry
 6 June: Festival Food Series - Malay
 20 June: Malaysian Batik
 17 July: Mass Rapid Transit
 8 August: 50th Anniversary of ASEAN - ASEAN Post (National Flower)
 19 August: SEA Games 2017
 1 September: 150 Years Straits Settlements Stamps - Provisional Issue
 9 September: Special Edition Series III - Their Majesties Yang di-Pertuan Agong of Malaysia
 14 September: NEGARAKU
 9 October: World Post Day (Pos-Silang)
 17 October: Festival Food Series - Indian
 3 November: Royal Visit of TRH The Prince of Wales & The Duchess of Cornwall - 60 Years Anniversary of Diplomatic Ties Malaysia - United Kingdom
 8 November: 150th Anniversary Sarawak State Legislative Assembly
 21 November: Tourist Destinations - Pahang, Perak & Terengganu
 1 December: 150 Years Straits Settlements - Permanent Issue
 4 December: Children's Holiday Activities - Stamp Week 2017
 19 December: #KitaJuara - 29th SEA Games, Kuala Lumpur 2017

2018
 18 January: Animals With Various Special Roles - Working Dogs
 30 January: Ornamental Fishes
 13 February: State Definitive Series - Kelantan (Garden flowers)
 27 February: Rivers in Malaysia
 3 March: 100th Anniversary of Yu Hua Kajang School
 20 March: Electric Train Service (ETS)
 10 April: Musical Instruments of Malaysia Series 2
 24 April: Malaysian Citrus
 17 May: Medicinal Plants Series 4
 5 June: Tourist Destinations - Sabah
 28 June: Unique Structures
 16 July: Telegraph Museum, Taiping
 23 July: Historical Museums in Malaysia
 14 August: Blowpipe
 31 August: National Day 2018
 16 September: Malaysia Day 2018
 9 October: World Post Day
 9 October: 100th Anniversary of Jit Sin High School Penang
 22 October: Installation of Sultan Sallehuddin Ibni Almarhum Sultan Badlishah, 29th Sultan of Kedah
 12 November: Malaysian Lifestyle Series 2 - Stamp Week 2018
 15 November: Malaysia Achievement in 18th Asian Games, Jakarta-Palembang 2018
 4 December: State Definitive Series - Orchid

2019
 15 January: Malaysian Festivals Series 3
 19 February: Exotic Food
 15 March: Tourist Destinations - Melaka & Sarawak
 9 April: Honey Bees in Malaysia
 11 May: Places of Worship Series II
 19 June: Sour Fruits
 18 July: 150 Years Sarawak Stamps
 28 July: Wildlife Conservation
 30 July: Installation of the XVI Yang di-Pertuan Agong Al-Sultan Abdullah Ri'ayatuddin Al-Mustafa Billah Shah Ibni AlMarhum Sultan Haji Ahmad Shah Al-Musta'in Billah
 8 August: ASEAN Post - National Costume
 22 August: Caves in Malaysia
 16 September: Malaysia Day 2019
 9 October: World Post Day (Pos-silang - Series 2)
 21 October: Stamp Week 2019
 19 November: 50 Years Anniversary of Diplomatic Relations between Malaysia and Romania - Endemic Flowers
 19 December: Craftsmanship in Malaysia

2020s

2020
 6 February: Malaysian Calligraphy - Series II
 18 June: Iconic Marine Life
 9 July: Wildflower Series III
 18 August: Rukun Negara 50 years
 29 August: Iconic building of Putrajaya
 16 September: Malaysia Day
 9 October: World Post Day
 29 December: World Tallest Tropical Tree
 31 Dec: 125th Anniversary of Johor's Constitution

2021
 25 February: Cattle Breeds in Malaysia
 1 April: 75th Anniversary of Radio Television Malaysia
 5 August: Hidden Treasure of Malaysia - Island
 19 August: King of Fruit in Malaysia - Durian
 9 September: Covid-19 Frontliner
 9 October: 2021 World Post Day
 10 November: National Literary Heritage
 18 November: Edible Flowers
 2 December: Vanishing Art of Making Traditional Kueh
 16 December: 100 years of Malaysian Football

2022 

 15 February: Traditional Art of Making Kuih
 17 March: Endangered Wildlife
 12 May: Waterfalls in Malaysia
 23 June: Traditional Boats in Malaysia
 07 July: 50 Years of Malaysia's First City - Kuala Lumpur
 10 August: Men's Headgear
 27 October: Traditional Clothing - Kebaya
 02 November: Recycling - Circular Economy
 30 November: 100 Years of Sultan Idris Education University
 10 December: Leisure Activities - Stamp Week 2022
 29 December: Malaysian Scholars

See also
 Stamp collecting
 Malaysian stamps
 Philately

External links 
 Pos Malaysia stamp gallery

Malaysian culture
Postage stamps of Malaysia